David William Smith  (born 13 February 1987 in Shellharbour) is an Australian sprint canoeist who has competed since the late 2000s. He won a silver medal in the K-2 1000 m event at the 2009 ICF Canoe Sprint World Championships in Dartmouth. He also won a silver at the 2011 ICF World Championships in Szeged, Hungary in the K-4 1000m, and then a bronze in the same event in 2013.

Smith competed in the K-4 1000 m event at the 2008 Summer Olympics in Beijing, but was eliminated in the semifinals. He was the member of Champion Australia's Kayak Four (K4) 1000m team in the London Olympics 2012, with Tate Smith (no relation), Murray Stewart and Jacob Clear.

References

External links
 Canoe09.ca profile
 

1987 births
Australian Institute of Sport canoeists
Australian male canoeists
Canoeists at the 2008 Summer Olympics
Canoeists at the 2012 Summer Olympics
Living people
Olympic canoeists of Australia
Olympic gold medalists for Australia
Olympic medalists in canoeing
ICF Canoe Sprint World Championships medalists in kayak
Medalists at the 2012 Summer Olympics
Recipients of the Medal of the Order of Australia
People from the Illawarra
Sportsmen from New South Wales
21st-century Australian people